Piletocera leucocephalis is a moth in the family Crambidae. It was described by George Hampson in 1917. It is found in Papua New Guinea, where it has been recorded from Rook Island in the Bismarck Archipelago.

References

leucocephalis
Moths described in 1917
Taxa named by George Hampson
Moths of New Guinea